The M16 rifle (officially designated Rifle, Caliber 5.56 mm, M16) is a family of military rifles adapted from the ArmaLite AR-15 rifle for the United States military. The original M16 rifle was a 5.56×45mm automatic rifle with a 20-round magazine.

In 1964, the M16 entered US military service and the following year was deployed for jungle warfare operations during the Vietnam War. In 1969, the M16A1 replaced the M14 rifle to become the US military's standard service rifle. The M16A1 incorporated numerous modifications including a bolt-assist, chrome-plated bore, protective reinforcement around the magazine release, and revised flash hider.

In 1983, the US Marine Corps adopted the M16A2 rifle and the US Army adopted it in 1986. The M16A2 fires the improved 5.56×45mm (M855/SS109) cartridge and has a newer adjustable rear sight, case deflector, heavy barrel, improved handguard, pistol grip and buttstock, as well as a semi-auto and three-round burst fire selector. Adopted in July 1997, the M16A4 is the fourth generation of the M16 series. It is equipped with a removable carrying handle and Picatinny rail for mounting optics and other ancillary devices.

The M16 has also been widely adopted by other armed forces around the world. Total worldwide production of M16s is approximately 8 million, making it the most-produced firearm of its 5.56 mm caliber. The US military has largely replaced the M16 in frontline combat units with a shorter and lighter version, the M4 carbine.

In April 2022, the U.S. Army selected the SIG MCX SPEAR as the winner of the Next Generation Squad Weapon Program to replace the M16/M4. The rifle is designated XM7.

History

Background

In 1928, a U.S. Army 'Caliber Board' conducted firing tests at Aberdeen Proving Ground and recommended transitioning to smaller caliber rounds, mentioning in particular  caliber. Largely in deference to tradition, this recommendation was ignored and the Army referred to the  caliber as "full sized" for the next 35 years. After World War II, the United States military started looking for a single automatic rifle to replace the M1 Garand, M1/M2 Carbines, M1918 Browning Automatic Rifle, M3 "Grease Gun" and Thompson submachine gun. However, early experiments with select-fire versions of the M1 Garand proved disappointing. During the Korean War, the select-fire M2 carbine largely replaced the submachine gun in US service and became the most widely used carbine variant. However, combat experience suggested that the .30 Carbine round was underpowered. American weapons designers concluded that an intermediate round was necessary, and recommended a small-caliber, high-velocity cartridge.

However, senior American commanders, having faced fanatical enemies and experienced major logistical problems during World War II and the Korean War, insisted that a single, powerful .30 caliber cartridge be developed, that could not only be used by the new automatic rifle, but by the new general-purpose machine gun (GPMG) in concurrent development. This culminated in the development of the 7.62×51 mm NATO cartridge.

The U.S. Army then began testing several rifles to replace the obsolete M1. Springfield Armory's T44E4 and heavier T44E5 were essentially updated versions of the M1 chambered for the new 7.62 mm round, while Fabrique Nationale submitted their FN FAL as the T48. ArmaLite entered the competition late, hurriedly submitting several AR-10 prototype rifles in the fall of 1956 to the U.S. Army's Springfield Armory for testing. The AR-10 featured an innovative straight-line barrel/stock design, forged aluminum alloy receivers and with phenolic composite stocks. It had rugged elevated sights, an oversized aluminum flash suppressor and recoil compensator, and an adjustable gas system. The final prototype featured an upper and lower receiver with the now-familiar hinge and takedown pins, and the charging handle was on top of the receiver placed inside of the carry handle. For a 7.62 mm NATO rifle, the AR-10 was incredibly lightweight at only  empty. Initial comments by Springfield Armory test staff were favorable, and some testers commented that the AR-10 was the best lightweight automatic rifle ever tested by the Armory. In the end the U.S. Army chose the T44, now named M14 rifle, which was an improved M1 Garand with a 20-round magazine and automatic fire capability. The U.S. also adopted the M60 general purpose machine gun (GPMG). Its NATO partners adopted the FN FAL and HK G3 rifles, as well as the FN MAG and Rheinmetall MG3 GPMGs.

The first confrontations between the AK-47 and the M14 came in the early part of the Vietnam War. Battlefield reports indicated that the M14 was uncontrollable in full-auto and that soldiers could not carry enough ammunition to maintain fire superiority over the AK-47. And, while the M2 carbine offered a high rate of fire, it was under-powered and ultimately outclassed by the AK-47. A replacement was needed: a medium between the traditional preference for high-powered rifles such as the M14, and the lightweight firepower of the M2 Carbine.

As a result, the Army was forced to reconsider a 1957 request by General Willard G. Wyman, commander of the U.S. Continental Army Command (CONARC) to develop a .223-inch caliber (5.56 mm) select-fire rifle weighing  when loaded with a 20-round magazine. The 5.56 mm round had to penetrate a standard U.S. helmet at 500 yards (460 meters) and retain a velocity in excess of the speed of sound, while matching or exceeding the wounding ability of the .30 Carbine cartridge.

This request ultimately resulted in the development of a scaled-down version of the Armalite AR-10, named the ArmaLite AR-15. The AR-15 was first revealed by Eugene Stoner at Fort Benning in May 1957. The AR-15 used .22-caliber bullets, which destabilized when they hit a human body, as opposed to the .30 round, which typically passed through in a straight line. The smaller caliber meant that it could be controlled in autofire due to the reduced bolt thrust and free recoil impulse. Being almost one-third the weight of the .30 meant that the soldier could sustain fire for longer with the same load. Due to design innovations, the AR-15 could fire 600 to 700 rounds a minute with an extremely low jamming rate. Parts were stamped out, not hand-machined, so could be mass-produced, and the stock was plastic to reduce weight.

In 1958, the Army's Combat Developments Experimentation Command ran experiments with small squads in combat situations using the M14, AR-15, and another rifle designed by Winchester. The resulting study recommended adopting a lightweight rifle like the AR-15. In response, the Army declared that all rifles and machine guns should use the same ammunition, and ordered full production of the M-14. However, advocates for the AR-15 gained the attention of Air Force Chief of Staff General Curtis LeMay. After testing the AR-15 with the ammunition manufactured by Remington that Armalite and Colt recommended, the Air Force declared that the AR-15 was its 'standard model' and ordered 8,500 rifles and 8.5 million rounds. Advocates for the AR-15 in the Defense Advanced Research Projects Agency acquired 1,000 Air Force AR-15s and shipped them to be tested by the Army of the Republic of Vietnam (ARVN). The South Vietnam soldiers issued glowing reports of the weapon's reliability, recording zero broken parts while firing 80,000 rounds in one stage of testing, and requiring only two replacement parts for the 1,000 weapons over the entire course of testing. The report of the experiment recommended that the U.S. provide the AR-15 as the standard rifle of the ARVN, but Admiral Harry Felt, then Commander in Chief, Pacific Forces, rejected the recommendations on the advice of the U.S. Army.

Throughout 1962 and 1963, the U.S. military extensively tested the AR-15. Positive evaluations emphasized its lightness, "lethality", and reliability. However, the Army Materiel Command criticized its inaccuracy at longer ranges and lack of penetrating power at higher ranges. In early 1963, the U.S. Special Forces asked, and was given permission, to make the AR-15 its standard weapon. Other users included Army Airborne units in Vietnam and some units affiliated with the Central Intelligence Agency. As more units adopted the AR-15, Secretary of the Army Cyrus Vance ordered an investigation into why the weapon had been rejected by the Army. The resulting report found that Army Materiel Command had rigged the previous tests, selecting tests that would favor the M14 and choosing match grade M14s to compete against AR-15s out of the box. At this point, the bureaucratic battle lines were well-defined, with the Army ordnance agencies opposed to the AR-15 and the Air Force and civilian leadership of the Defense Department in favor.

In January 1963, Secretary of Defense Robert McNamara concluded that the AR-15 was the superior weapon system and ordered a halt to M14 production. In late 1963, the Defense Department began mass procurement of rifles for the Air Force and special Army units. Secretary McNamara designated the Army as the procurer for the weapon with the Department, which allowed the Army ordnance establishment to modify the weapon as they wished. The first modification was the addition of a "manual bolt closure," allowing a soldier to ram in a round if it failed to seat properly. The Air Force, which was buying the rifle, and the Marine Corps, which had tested it both objected to this addition, with the Air Force noting, "During three years of testing and operation of the AR-15 rifle under all types of conditions the Air Force has no record of malfunctions that could have been corrected by a manual bolt closing device." They also noted that the closure added weight and complexity, reducing the reliability of the weapon. Colonel Harold Yount, who managed the Army procurement, would later state the bolt closure was added after direction from senior leadership, rather than as a result of any complaint or test result, and testified about the reasons: "the M-1, the M-14, and the carbine had always had something for the soldier to push on; that maybe this would be a comforting feeling to him, or something."

After modifications, the new redesigned rifle was subsequently adopted as the M16 Rifle. 

Despite its early failures the M16 proved to be a revolutionary design and stands as the longest continuously serving rifle in US military history. It has been adopted by many US allies and the 5.56×45 mm NATO cartridge has become not only the NATO standard, but "the standard assault-rifle cartridge in much of the world." It also led to the development of small-caliber high-velocity service rifles by every major army in the world. It is a benchmark against which other assault rifles are judged.

Colt, H&R and GM Hydramatic Division manufactured M16A1 rifles during the Vietnam War.

M16s were produced by Colt until the late 1980s, when FN Herstal (FN USA) began to manufacture them.

Adoption
In July 1960, General Curtis LeMay was impressed by a demonstration of the ArmaLite AR-15. In the summer of 1961, General LeMay was promoted to U.S. Air Force chief of staff, and requested 80,000 AR-15s. However, General Maxwell D. Taylor, chairman of the Joint Chiefs of Staff, advised President John F. Kennedy that having two different calibers within the military system at the same time would be problematic and the request was rejected. In October 1961, William Godel, a senior man at the Advanced Research Projects Agency, sent 10 AR-15s to South Vietnam. The reception was enthusiastic, and in 1962 another 1,000 AR-15s were sent. United States Army Special Forces personnel filed battlefield reports lavishly praising the AR-15 and the stopping-power of the 5.56 mm cartridge, and pressed for its adoption.

The damage caused by the 5.56 mm bullet was originally believed to be caused by "tumbling" due to the slow 1 turn in  rifling twist rate. However, any pointed lead core bullet will "tumble" after penetration in flesh, because the center of gravity is towards the rear of the bullet. The large wounds observed by soldiers in Vietnam were actually caused by bullet fragmentation created by a combination of the bullet's velocity and construction. These wounds were so devastating, that the photographs remained classified into the 1980s.

However, despite overwhelming evidence that the AR-15 could bring more firepower to bear than the M14, the Army opposed the adoption of the new rifle. U.S. Secretary of Defense Robert McNamara now had two conflicting views: the ARPA report favoring the AR-15 and the Army's position favoring the M14. Even President Kennedy expressed concern, so McNamara ordered Secretary of the Army, Cyrus Vance, to test the M14, the AR-15 and the AK-47. The Army reported that only the M14 was suitable for service, but Vance wondered about the impartiality of those conducting the tests. He ordered the Army inspector general to investigate the testing methods used; the inspector general confirmed that the testers were biased towards the M14.

In January 1963, Secretary McNamara received reports that M14 production was insufficient to meet the needs of the armed forces and ordered a halt to M14 production. At the time, the AR-15 was the only rifle that could fulfill a requirement of a "universal" infantry weapon for issue to all services. McNamara ordered its adoption, despite receiving reports of several deficiencies, most notably the lack of a chrome-plated chamber.

After modifications (most notably, the charging handle was re-located from under the carrying handle like the AR-10, to the rear of the receiver), the new redesigned rifle was renamed the Rifle, Caliber 5.56 mm, M16. Inexplicably, the modification to the new M16 did not include a chrome-plated barrel. Meanwhile, the Army relented and recommended the adoption of the M16 for jungle warfare operations. However, the Army insisted on the inclusion of a forward assist to help push the bolt into battery in the event that a cartridge failed to seat into the chamber. The Air Force, Colt and Eugene Stoner believed that the addition of a forward assist was an unjustified expense. As a result, the design was split into two variants: the Air Force's M16 without the forward assist, and the XM16E1 with the forward assist for the other service branches.

In November 1963, McNamara approved the U.S. Army's order of 85,000 XM16E1s; and to appease General LeMay, the Air Force was granted an order for another 19,000 M16s. In March 1964, the M16 rifle went into production and the Army accepted delivery of the first batch of 2,129 rifles later that year, and an additional 57,240 rifles the following year.

In 1964, the Army was informed that DuPont could not mass-produce the IMR 4475 stick powder to the specifications demanded by the M16. Therefore, Olin Mathieson Company provided a high-performance ball propellant.

In March 1965, the Army began to issue the XM16E1 to infantry units. However, the rifle was initially delivered without adequate cleaning kits or instructions because advertising from Colt asserted that the M16's materials made the weapon require little maintenance, and was capable of self-cleaning. Furthermore, cleaning was often conducted with improper equipment, such as insect repellent, water, and aircraft fuel, which induced further wear on the weapon. As a result, reports of stoppages in combat began to surface. The most severe problem was known as "failure to extract"—the spent cartridge case remained lodged in the chamber after the rifle was fired. Documented accounts of dead U.S. troops found next to disassembled rifles eventually led to a Congressional investigation.

In February 1967, the improved XM16E1 was standardized as the M16A1. The new rifle had a chrome-plated chamber and bore to eliminate corrosion and stuck cartridges, and other minor modifications. New cleaning kits, powder solvents, and lubricants were also issued. Intensive training programs in weapons cleaning were instituted including a comic book-style operations manual. As a result, reliability problems greatly diminished and the M16A1 rifle achieved widespread acceptance by U.S. troops in Vietnam.

In 1969, the M16A1 officially replaced the M14 rifle to become the U.S. military's standard service rifle. In 1970, the new WC 844 powder was introduced to reduce fouling.

Reliability

During the early part of its service, the M16 had a reputation for poor reliability and a malfunction rate of two per 1000 rounds fired. The M16's action works by passing high-pressure propellant gasses tapped from the barrel down a tube and into the carrier group within the upper receiver, and is commonly referred to as a "direct impingement gas system". The gas goes from the gas tube, through the bolt carrier key, and into the inside of the carrier where it expands in a donut-shaped gas cylinder. Because the bolt is prevented from moving forward by the barrel, the carrier is driven to the rear by the expanding gases and thus converts the energy of the gas to movement of the rifle's parts. The back part of the bolt forms a piston head and the cavity in the bolt carrier is the piston sleeve. It is more correct to call it an internal piston system.

This design is much lighter and more compact than a gas-piston design. However, this design requires that combustion byproducts from the discharged cartridge be blown into the receiver as well. This accumulating carbon and vaporized metal build-up within the receiver and bolt-carrier negatively affects reliability and necessitates more intensive maintenance on the part of the individual soldier. The channeling of gasses into the bolt carrier during operation increases the amount of heat that is deposited in the receiver while firing the M16 and causes essential lubricant to be "burned off". This requires frequent and generous applications of appropriate lubricant. Lack of proper lubrication is the most common source of weapon stoppages or jams.

The original M16 fared poorly in the jungles of Vietnam and was infamous for reliability problems in the harsh environment. Max Hastings was very critical of the M16's general field issue in Vietnam just as grievous design flaws were becoming apparent. He further states that the Shooting Times experienced repeated malfunctions with a test M16 and assumed these would be corrected before military use, but they were not. Many Marines and soldiers were so angry with the reliability problems they began writing home and on the 26th of March 1967 the Washington Daily News broke the story. Eventually the M16 became the target of a Congressional investigation. The investigation found that:

 The M16 was issued to troops without cleaning kits or instruction on how to clean the rifle.
 The M16 and 5.56×45 mm cartridge was tested and approved with the use of a DuPont IMR8208M extruded powder, that was switched to Olin Mathieson WC846 ball powder which produced much more fouling, that quickly jammed the action of the M16 (unless the gun was cleaned well and often).
 The M16 lacked a forward assist (rendering the rifle inoperable when it failed to go fully forward).
 The M16 lacked a chrome-plated chamber, which allowed corrosion problems and contributed to case extraction failures (which was considered the most severe problem and required extreme measures to clear, such as inserting the cleaning-rod down the barrel and knocking the spent cartridge out).

When these issues were addressed and corrected by the M16A1, the reliability problems decreased greatly. According to a 1968 Department of Army report, the M16A1 rifle achieved widespread acceptance by U.S. troops in Vietnam. "Most men armed with the M16 in Vietnam rated this rifle's performance high, however, many men entertained some misgivings about the M16's reliability. When asked what weapon they preferred to carry in combat, 85 percent indicated that they wanted either the M16 or its [smaller] carbine-length version, the XM177E2."  Also "the M14 was preferred by 15 percent, while less than one percent wished to carry either the Stoner rifle, the AK-47, the [M1] carbine or a pistol." In March 1970, the "President's Blue Ribbon Defense Panel" concluded that the issuance of the M16 saved the lives of 20,000 U.S. servicemen during the Vietnam War, who would have otherwise died had the M14 remained in service. However, the M16 rifle's reputation has suffered as of 2011.

Another underlying cause of the M16’s jamming problem was identified by ordnance staff that discovered that Stoner and ammunition manufacturers had initially tested the AR 15 using DuPont IMR8208M extruded (stick) powder. Later ammunition manufacturers adopted the more readily available Olin Mathieson WC846 ball powder. The ball powder produced a longer peak chamber pressure with undesired timing effects. Upon firing, the cartridge case expands and seals the chamber (obturation). When the peak pressure starts to drop the cartridge case contracts and then can be extracted. With ball powder, the cartridge case was not contracted enough during extraction due to the longer peak pressure period. The ejector would then fail to extract the cartridge case, tearing through the case rim, leaving an obturated case behind.

After the introduction of the M4 Carbine, it was found that the shorter barrel length of 14.5 inches also has a negative effect on reliability, as the gas port is located closer to the chamber than the gas port of the standard length M16 rifle: 7.5 inches instead of 13 inches. This affects the M4's timing and increases the amount of stress and heat on the critical components, thereby reducing reliability. In a 2002 assessment the USMC found that the M4 malfunctioned three times more often than the M16A4 (the M4 failed 186 times for 69,000 rounds fired, while the M16A4 failed 61 times). Thereafter, the Army and Colt worked to make modifications to the M4s and M16A4s in order to address the problems found. In tests conducted in 2005 and 2006 the Army found that on average, the new M4s and M16s fired approximately 5,000 rounds between stoppages.

In December 2006, the Center for Naval Analyses (CNA) released a report on U.S. small arms in combat.  The CNA conducted surveys on 2,608 troops returning from combat in Iraq and Afghanistan over the past 12 months.  Only troops who had fired their weapons at enemy targets were allowed to participate. 1,188 troops were armed with M16A2 or A4 rifles, making up 46 percent of the survey.  75 percent of M16 users (891 troops) reported they were satisfied with the weapon.  60 percent (713 troops) were satisfied with handling qualities such as handguards, size, and weight.  Of the 40 percent dissatisfied, most were with its size.  Only 19 percent of M16 users (226 troops) reported a stoppage, while 80 percent of those that experienced a stoppage said it had little impact on their ability to clear the stoppage and re-engage their target.  Half of the M16 users experienced failures of their magazines to feed.  83 percent (986 troops) did not need their rifles repaired while in theater. 71 percent (843 troops) were confident in the M16's reliability, defined as level of soldier confidence their weapon will fire without malfunction, and 72 percent (855 troops) were confident in its durability, defined as level of soldier confidence their weapon will not break or need repair.  Both factors were attributed to high levels of soldiers performing their own maintenance.  60 percent of M16 users offered recommendations for improvements.  Requests included greater bullet lethality, new-built instead of rebuilt rifles, better quality magazines, decreased weight, and a collapsible stock.  Some users recommended shorter and lighter weapons such as the M4 carbine. Some issues have been addressed with the issuing of the Improved STANAG magazine in March 2009, and the M855A1 Enhanced Performance Round in June 2010.

In early 2010, two journalists from The New York Times spent three months with soldiers and Marines in Afghanistan.  While there, they questioned around 100 infantry troops about the reliability of their M16 rifles, as well as the M4 carbine.  The troops did not report reliability problems with their rifles. While only 100 troops were asked, they engaged in daily fighting in Marja, including least a dozen intense engagements in Helmand Province, where the ground is covered in fine powdered sand (called "moon dust" by troops) that can stick to firearms. Weapons were often dusty, wet, and covered in mud.  Intense firefights lasted hours with several magazines being expended. Only one soldier reported a jam when his M16 was covered in mud after climbing out of a canal. The weapon was cleared and resumed firing with the next chambered round. Furthermore, the Marine Chief Warrant Officer responsible for weapons training and performance of the Third Battalion, Sixth Marines, reported that "We've had nil in the way of problems; we've had no issues", with his battalion's 350 M16s and 700 M4s.

Design

The M16 is a lightweight, 5.56 mm, air-cooled, gas-operated, magazine-fed assault rifle, with a rotating bolt. The M16's receivers are made of 7075 aluminum alloy, its barrel, bolt, and bolt carrier of steel, and its handguards, pistol grip, and buttstock of plastics.

The M16 internal piston action was derived from the original ArmaLite AR-10 and ArmaLite AR-15 actions. This internal piston action system designed by Eugene Stoner is commonly called a direct impingement system, but it does not use a conventional direct impingement system. In , the designer states: ″This invention is a true expanding gas system instead of the conventional impinging gas system.″
The gas system, bolt carrier, and bolt-locking design were novel for the time.

It is also lighter when compared to the AKM's  with a loaded 30-round magazine.

The M16A2 weighs  loaded with a 30-round magazine, because of the adoption of a thicker barrel profile. The thicker barrel is more resistant to damage when handled roughly and is also slower to overheat during sustained fire. Unlike a traditional "bull" barrel that is thick its entire length, the M16A2's barrel is only thick forward of the handguards. The barrel profile under the handguards remained the same as the M16A1 for compatibility with the M203 grenade launcher.

Barrel
Early model M16 barrels had a rifling twist of four grooves, right-hand twist, one turn in 14 inches (1:355.6 mm or 64 calibers) bore—as it was the same rifling as used by the .222 Remington sporting cartridge. After finding out that under unfavorable conditions, military bullets could yaw in flight at long ranges, the rifling was soon altered. Later M16 models and the M16A1 had an improved rifling with six grooves, right-hand twist, one turn in 12 inches (1:304.8 mm or 54.8 calibers) for increased accuracy and was optimized to adequately stabilize the M193 ball and M196 tracer bullets. M16A2 and current models are optimized for firing the heavier NATO SS109 ball and long L110 tracer bullets and have six grooves, right-hand twist, one turn in 7 in (1:177.8 mm or 32 calibers).

Using M193 ball and M196 tracer bullets with a one turn in 7 in (1:177.8 mm or 32 calibers) twist degrades accuracy and should only be used in emergency situations. NATO SS109 ball and L110 tracer bullets should only be used in emergency situations at ranges under  with a one turn in 12 inches (1:304.8 mm or 54.8 calibers) twist, as this twist is insufficient to stabilize these projectiles.
Weapons designed to adequately stabilize both the M193 or SS109 projectiles (like civilian market clones) usually have a six-groove, right-hand twist, one turn in 9 inches (1:228.6 mm or 41.1 calibers) or one turn in 8 inches (1:203.2 mm or 36.5 calibers) bore, although other and 1:7 inches twist rates are available as well.

Recoil

The M16 uses a "straight-line" recoil design, where the recoil spring is located in the stock directly behind the action, and serves the dual function of operating spring and recoil buffer. The stock being in line with the bore also reduces muzzle rise, especially during automatic fire. Because recoil does not significantly shift the point of aim, faster follow-up shots are possible and user fatigue is reduced. In addition, current model M16 flash-suppressors also act as compensators to reduce recoil further.

Notes: Free recoil is calculated by using the rifle weight, bullet weight, muzzle velocity, and charge weight. It is that which would be measured if the rifle were fired suspended from strings, free to recoil. A rifle's perceived recoil is also dependent on many other factors which are not readily quantified.

Sights

The M16's most distinctive ergonomic feature is the carrying handle and rear sight assembly on top of the receiver. This is a by-product of the original AR-10 design, where the carrying handle contained a rear sight that could be set for specific range settings and also served to protect the charging handle.
In Delft, the Netherlands Artillerie-Inrichtingen produced a roughly similar 3×25 telescopic sight for the carrying handle mounting interfaces.
	
The M16 elevated iron sight line has a  sight radius. As the M16 series rear sight, front sight and sighting in targets designs were modified over time and non-iron sight (optical) aiming devices and new service ammunition were introduced zeroing procedures changed.
	
The standard pre-M16A2 "Daylight Sight System" uses an AR-15-style L-type flip, two aperture rear sight featuring two combat settings: short-range  and long-range , marked 'L'.
The rear sight features a windage drum that can be adjusted during zeroing with about 1 MOA increments. The front sight is a tapered round post of approximately  diameter adjustable during zeroing in about 1 MOA increments. A cartridge or tool is required to (re)zero the sight line.

Regulation stipulates the radioluminescant front sight post must be replaced if more than 144 months (12 years) elapsed after manufacture. The "Low Light Level Sight System" elevation and windage adjustment increments are somewhat coarser compared to the "Daylight Sight System".

The unmarked approximately  diameter aperture rear sight is for normal firing situations, zeroing and with the elevation knob for target distances up to 800 meters. The downsides of relatively small rear sight apertures are less light transmission through the aperture and a reduced field of view. A new larger approximately  diameter aperture, marked '0-2' and featuring a windage setting index mark, offers a larger field of view during battle conditions and is used as a ghost ring for quick target engagement and during limited visibility. When flipped down, the engraved windage mark on top of the '0-2' aperture ring shows the dialed in windage setting on a windage scale at the rear of the rear sight assembly. When the normal use rear aperture sight is zeroed at 300 m with SS109/M855 ammunition, first used in the M16A2, the '0-2' rear sight will be zeroed for 200 m.
The front sight post was widened to approximately  diameter and became square and became adjustable during zeroing in about 1.2 MOA increments.

The M16A4 omitted the carrying handle and rear sight assembly on top of the receiver. Instead, it features a MIL-STD-1913 Picatinny railed flat-top upper receiver for mounting various optical sighting devices or a new detachable carrying handle and M16A2-style rear sight assembly.
The current U.S. Army and Air Force issue M4(A1) Carbine comes with the M68 Close Combat Optic and Back-up Iron Sight. The U.S. Marine Corps uses the 4×32 ACOG Rifle Combat Optic and the U.S. Navy uses the EOTech Holographic Weapon Sight.

Range and accuracy
The M16 rifle is considered to be very accurate for a service rifle. Its light recoil, high-velocity and flat trajectory allow shooters to take head shots out to 300 meters. Newer M16s use the newer M855 cartridge increasing their effective range to 600 meters. They are more accurate than their predecessors and are capable of shooting 1–3-inch groups at 100 yards. "In Fallujah, Iraq Marines with ACOG-equipped M16A4s created a stir by taking so many head shots that until the wounds were closely examined, some observers thought the insurgents had been executed." The newest M855A1 EPR cartridge is even more accurate and during testing "...has shown that, on average, 95 percent of the rounds will hit within an 8 × 8-inch (20.3 × 20.3 cm) target at 600 meters."

Note *: The effective range of a firearm is the maximum distance at which a weapon may be expected to be accurate and achieve the desired effect. Note **: The horizontal range is the distance traveled by a bullet, fired from the rifle at a height of 1.6 meters and 0° elevation, until the bullet hits the ground. Note ***: The lethal range is the maximum range of a small-arms projectile, while still maintaining the minimum energy required to put unprotected personnel out of action, which is generally believed to be 15 kilogram-meters (147 J / 108 ft.lbf). This is the equivalent of the muzzle energy of a .22LR handgun. Note ****: The maximum range of a small-arms projectile is attained at about 30° elevation. This maximum range is only of safety interest, not for combat firing.

Terminal ballistics
The 5.56×45 mm cartridge had several advantages over the 7.62×51 mm NATO round used in the M14 rifle. It enabled each soldier to carry more ammunition and was easier to control during automatic or burst fire. The 5.56×45 mm NATO cartridge can also produce massive wounding effects when the bullet impacts at high speed and yaws ("tumbles") in tissue leading to fragmentation and rapid transfer of energy.

The original ammunition for the M16 was the 55-grain M193 cartridge. These wounds were so devastating that many considered the M16 to be an inhumane weapon. As the 5.56 mm round's velocity decreases, so does the number of fragments that it produces. The 5.56 mm round does not normally fragment at distances beyond 200 meters or at velocities below 2500 ft/s, and its lethality becomes largely dependent on shot placement.

With the development of the M16A2, the new 62-grain M855 cartridge was adopted in 1983. The heavier bullet had more energy and was made with a steel core to penetrate Soviet body armor. However, this caused less fragmentation on impact and reduced effects against targets without armor, both of which lessened kinetic energy transfer and wounding ability. Some soldiers and Marines coped with this through training, with requirements to shoot vital areas three times to guarantee killing the target.

However, there have been repeated and consistent reports of the M855's inability to wound effectively (i.e., fragment) when fired from the short barreled M4 carbine (even at close ranges). The M4's 14.5-in. barrel length reduces muzzle velocity to about 2900 ft/s. This reduced wounding ability is one reason that, despite the Army's transition to short-barrel M4s, the Marine Corps has decided to continue using the M16A4 with its 20-inch barrel as the 5.56×45 mm M855 is largely dependent upon high velocity in order to wound effectively.

In 2003, the U.S. Army contended that the lack of lethality of the 5.56×45 mm was more a matter of perception than fact. With good shot placement to the head and chest, the target was usually defeated without issue. The majority of failures were the result of hitting the target in non-vital areas such as extremities. However, a minority of failures occurred in spite of multiple hits to the chest. In 2006, a study found that 20% of soldiers using the M4 Carbine wanted more lethality or stopping power. In June 2010, the U.S. Army announced it began shipping its new 5.56 mm, lead-free, M855A1 Enhanced Performance Round to active combat zones. This upgrade is designed to maximize performance of the 5.56×45 mm round, to extend range, improve accuracy, increase penetration and to consistently fragment in soft-tissue when fired from not only standard length M16s, but also the short-barreled M4 carbines. The U.S. Army has been impressed with the new M855A1 EPR round. A 7.62 NATO M80A1 EPR variant was also developed.

Magazines

The M16's magazine was meant to be a lightweight, disposable item. As such, it is made of pressed/stamped aluminum and was not designed to be durable. The M16 originally used a 20-round magazine which was later replaced by a bent 30-round design. As a result, the magazine follower tends to rock or tilt, causing malfunctions. Many non-U.S. and commercial magazines have been developed to effectively mitigate these shortcomings (e.g., H&K's all-stainless-steel magazine, Magpul's polymer P-MAG, etc.).

Production of the 30-round magazine started late 1967 but did not fully replace the 20-round magazine until the mid-1970s. The newer plastic magazines are about a half-inch longer. The newer steel magazines are about 0.5-inch longer and four ounces heavier. The M16's magazine has become the unofficial NATO STANAG magazine and is currently used by many Western nations, in numerous weapon systems.

In 2009, the U.S. Military began fielding an "improved magazine" identified by a tan-colored follower. "The new follower incorporates an extended rear leg and modified bullet protrusion for improved round stacking and orientation. The self-leveling/anti-tilt follower minimizes jamming while a wider spring coil profile creates even force distribution. The performance gains have not added weight or cost to the magazines."

In July 2016, the U.S. Army introduced another improvement, the new Enhanced Performance Magazine, which it says will result in a 300% increase in reliability in the M4 Carbine. Developed by the United States Army Armament Research, Development and Engineering Center and the Army Research Laboratory in 2013, it is tan colored with blue follower to distinguish it from earlier, incompatible magazines.

Muzzle devices
Most M16 rifles have a barrel threaded in 1⁄2-28" threads to incorporate the use of a muzzle device such as a flash suppressor or sound suppressor. The initial flash suppressor design had three tines or prongs and was designed to preserve the shooter's night vision by disrupting the flash. Unfortunately it was prone to breakage and getting entangled in vegetation. The design was later changed to close the end to avoid this and became known as the "A1" or "bird cage" flash suppressor on the M16A1. Eventually on the M16A2 version of the rifle, the bottom port was closed to reduce muzzle climb and prevent dust from rising when the rifle was fired in the prone position. For these reasons, the U.S. military declared the A2 flash suppressor as a compensator or a muzzle brake; but it is more commonly known as the "GI" or "A2" flash suppressor.

The M16's Vortex Flash Hider weighs 3 ounces, is 2.25 inches long, and does not require a lock washer to attach to barrel. It was developed in 1984, and is one of the earliest privately designed muzzle devices. The U.S. military uses the Vortex Flash Hider on M4 carbines and M16 rifles. A version of the Vortex has been adopted by the Canadian Military for the Colt Canada C8 CQB rifle. Other flash suppressors developed for the M16 include the Phantom Flash Suppressor by Yankee Hill Machine (YHM) and the KX-3 by Noveske Rifleworks.

The threaded barrel allows sound suppressors with the same thread pattern to be installed directly to the barrel; however this can result in complications such as being unable to remove the suppressor from the barrel due to repeated firing on full auto or three-round burst. A number of suppressor manufacturers have designed "direct-connect" sound suppressors which can be installed over an existing M16's flash suppressor as opposed to using the barrel's threads.

Grenade launchers and shotguns

All current M16 type rifles can mount under-barrel 40 mm grenade-launchers, such as the M203 and M320. Both use the same 40×46mm LV grenades as the older, stand-alone M79 grenade launcher. The M16 can also mount under-barrel 12 gauge shotguns such as KAC Masterkey or the M26 Modular Accessory Shotgun System.

Riot Control Launcher

The M234 Riot Control Launcher is an M16-series rifle attachment firing an M755 blank round. The M234 mounts on the muzzle, bayonet lug, and front sight post of the M16. It fires either the M734 64 mm Kinetic Riot Control or the M742 64 mm CSI Riot Control Ring Airfoil Projectiles. The latter produces a 4 to 5-foot tear gas cloud on impact. The main advantage to using Ring Airfoil Projectiles is that their design does not allow them be thrown back by rioters with any real effect. The M234 is no longer used by U.S. forces. It has been replaced by the M203 grenade launcher and nonlethal ammunition.

Bayonet
The M16 is 44.25 inches (1124 mm) long with an M7 bayonet attached. The M7 bayonet is based on earlier designs such as the M4, M5, & M6 bayonets, all of which are direct descendants of the M3 Fighting Knife and have spear-point blade with a half sharpened secondary edge. The newer M9 bayonet has a clip-point blade with saw teeth along the spine, and can be used as a multi-purpose knife and wire-cutter when combined with its scabbard. The current USMC OKC-3S bayonet bears a resemblance to the Marines' iconic Ka-Bar fighting knife with serrations near the handle.

Bipod
For use as an ad-hoc automatic rifle, the M16 and M16A1 could be equipped with the XM3 bipod, later standardized as the Bipod, M3 (1966) and Rifle Bipod M3 (1983). Weighing only 0.6 lb, the simple and non-adjustable bipod clamps to the barrel of the rifle to allow for supported fire.

The M3 bipod continues to be referenced in at least one official manual as late as 1985, where it is stated that one of the most stable firing positions is "the prone biped [sic] supported for automatic fire."

NATO standards
In March 1970, the U.S. recommended that all NATO forces adopt the 5.56×45 mm cartridge. This shift represented a change in the philosophy of the military's long-held position about caliber size. By the mid 1970s, other armies were looking at M16-style weapons. A NATO standardization effort soon started and tests of various rounds were carried out starting in 1977. The U.S. offered the 5.56×45 mm M193 round, but there were concerns about its penetration in the face of the wider introduction of body armor. In the end the Belgian 5.56×45 mm SS109 round was chosen (STANAG 4172) in October 1980. The SS109 round was based on the U.S. cartridge but included a new stronger, heavier, 62 grain bullet design, with better long range performance and improved penetration (specifically, to consistently penetrate the side of a steel helmet at 600 meters). Due to its design and lower muzzle velocity (about 3110 ft/s) the Belgian SS109 round is considered more humane because it is less likely to fragment than the U.S. M193 round. The NATO 5.56×45 mm standard ammunition produced for U.S. forces is designated M855.

In October 1980, shortly after NATO accepted the 5.56×45 mm NATO rifle cartridge. Draft Standardization Agreement 4179 (STANAG 4179) was proposed to allow NATO members to easily share rifle ammunition and magazines down to the individual soldier level. The magazine chosen to become the STANAG magazine was originally designed for the U.S. M16 rifle. Many NATO member nations, but not all, subsequently developed or purchased rifles with the ability to accept this type of magazine. However, the standard was never ratified and remains a 'Draft STANAG'.

All current M16 type rifles are designed to fire STANAG 22 mm rifle grenades from their integral flash hiders without the use of an adapter. These 22 mm grenade types range from anti-tank rounds to simple finned tubes with a fragmentation hand grenade attached to the end. They come in the "standard" type which are propelled by a blank cartridge inserted into the chamber of the rifle. They also come in the "bullet trap" and "shoot through" types, as their names imply, they use live ammunition. The U.S. military does not generally use rifle grenades; however, they are used by other nations.

The NATO Accessory Rail STANAG 4694, or Picatinny rail STANAG 2324, or a "Tactical Rail" is a bracket used on M16 type rifles to provide a standardized mounting platform. The rail comprises a series of ridges with a T-shaped cross-section interspersed with flat "spacing slots". Scopes are mounted either by sliding them on from one end or the other; by means of a "rail-grabber" which is clamped to the rail with bolts, thumbscrews or levers; or onto the slots between the raised sections. The rail was originally for scopes. However, once established, the use of the system was expanded to other accessories, such as tactical lights, laser aiming modules, night vision devices, reflex sights, foregrips, bipods, and bayonets.

Currently, the M16 is in use by 15 NATO countries and more than 80 countries worldwide.

Variants

M16

This was the first M16 variant adopted operationally, originally by the U.S. Air Force. It was equipped with triangular handguards, buttstocks without a compartment for the storage of a cleaning kit, a three-pronged "duckbill" flash suppressor designed to preserve the shooter's night vision by disrupting the flash, full auto, and no forward assist. The M16 has a safe/semi/auto selective fire trigger group. Bolt carriers were originally chrome plated and slick-sided, lacking forward assist notches. Later, the chrome plated carriers were dropped in favor of Army issued notched and parkerized carriers though the interior portion of the bolt carrier is still chrome-lined.
The barrel rifling had a 1:12 (305 mm) twist rate to adequately stabilize M193 ball and M196 tracer ammunition.
The Air Force continued to operate these weapons until around 2001, at which time the Air Force converted all of its M16s to the M16A2 configuration.

The M16 was also adopted by the British SAS, who used it during the Falklands War.

XM16E1 and M16A1 (Colt Model 603)

The U.S. Army XM16E1 was essentially the same weapon as the M16 with the addition of a forward assist and corresponding notches in the bolt carrier. The M16A1 was the finalized production model in 1967 and was produced until 1982.

To address issues raised by the XM16E1's testing cycle, a closed, birdcage symmetric flash suppressor with open side slots to the top, bottom, left and right replaced the XM16E1's three-pronged flash suppressor which caught on twigs and leaves from 1967 onwards. Various other changes were made after numerous problems in the field. Cleaning kits were developed and issued while barrels with chrome-plated chambers and later fully lined bores were introduced. A small storage compartment inside the stock was introduced. The buttstock storage compartment is often used for storing a basic cleaning kit.

With these and other changes, the malfunction rate slowly declined and new soldiers were generally unfamiliar with early problems. A rib was built into the side of the receiver on the XM16E1 to help prevent accidentally pressing the magazine release button while closing the ejection port cover. This rib was later extended on production M16A1s to help in preventing the magazine release from inadvertently being pressed. The hole in the bolt that accepts the cam pin was crimped inward on one side, in such a way that the cam pin may not be inserted with the bolt installed backwards, which would cause failures to eject until corrected. The M16A1 saw limited use in training capacities until the early 2000s, but is no longer in active service with the U.S., although is still standard issue in many world armies.

M16A2

The development of the M16A2 rifle was originally requested by the United States Marine Corps in 1979 as a result of combat experience in Vietnam with the M16A1. It was officially adopted by the Department of Defense as the "Rifle, 5.56 mm, M16A2" in 1983. The Marines were the first branch of the U.S. Armed Forces to adopt it, in the early/mid-1980s, with the United States Army following suit in 1986.

Modifications to the M16A2 were extensive. In addition to the then new STANAG 4172 5.56×45mm NATO chambering and its accompanying rifling, the barrel was made with a greater thickness in front of the front sight post, to resist bending in the field and to allow a longer period of sustained fire without overheating. The rest of the barrel was maintained at the original thickness to enable the M203 grenade launcher to be attached.
The barrel rifling was revised to a faster 1:7 (178 mm) twist rate to adequately stabilize the new 5.56×45 mm NATO SS109/M855 ball and L110/M856 tracer ammunition.
A new adjustable rear sight was added, allowing the rear sight to be dialed in for specific range settings between 300 and 800 meters to take full advantage of the ballistic characteristics of the SS109/M855 rounds and to allow windage adjustments without the need of a tool or cartridge. The flash suppressor was again modified, this time to be closed on the bottom, so the new birdcage-type muzzle device would not kick up dirt or snow when being fired from the prone position, and additionally act as an asymmetric recoil compensator to reduce muzzle climb.

A spent case deflector was incorporated into the upper receiver immediately behind the ejection port to prevent (hot) cartridge cases from striking left-handed users. The action was also modified, replacing the fully automatic setting with a three-round burst setting. When using a fully automatic weapon, inexperienced troops often hold down the trigger and "spray" when under fire. The U.S. Army concluded that three-shot groups provide an optimum combination of ammunition conservation, accuracy, and firepower. The USMC has retired the M16A2 in favor of the newer M16A4; a few M16A2s remain in service with the U.S. Army Reserve and National Guard, Air Force, Navy and Coast Guard.

The handguard was modified from the original triangular shape to a round one, which better fit smaller hands and could be fitted to older models of the M16. The new handguards were also symmetrical so armories need not separate left- and right-hand spares. The handguard retention ring was tapered to make it easier to install and uninstall the handguards.

The new buttstock became ten times stronger than the original due to advances in polymer technology since the early 1960s. Original M16 stocks were made from cellulose-impregnated phenolic resin; the newer M16A2 stocks were engineered from DuPont Zytel glass-filled thermoset polymers and became a replacement part for the preceding M16A1.

A notch for the middle finger was added to the pistol grip as well as more texture to enhance the grip. The new pistol grips were engineered from Zytel glass-filled thermoset polymers. The M16A2 pistol grip became a replacement part for the preceding M16A1.

The standard Model 645 M16A2 has a safe/semi/three-round burst selective fire trigger group. It became standard issue for the U.S. Marine Corps and Army.
There is also a safe/semi/three-round burst/automatic selective fire trigger group Model 708 version of M16A2 rifle named "M16A2 Enhanced", used by some militaries around the world.

M16A3

The M16A3 is a modified version of the M16A2 adopted in small numbers by the U.S. Navy SEAL, Seabee, and Security units. It features the M16A1 selective fire trigger group providing "safe", "semi-automatic" and "fully automatic" modes. Otherwise it is externally similar to the M16A2.

M16A4

The M16A4 is the fourth generation of the M16 series. The iron sight/carrying handle assembly on the M16A2/M16A3 upper receiver, was replaced by a MIL-STD-1913 "Picatinny railed" flat-top upper receiver for mounting aiming optics or a removable iron sight/carrying handle assembly. The M16A4 rear aperture sights integrated in the Picatinny rail mounted carry handle assembly are adjustable from 300 m (328 yd) up to 600 m (656 yd), where the further similar M16A2 iron sights line can reach up to 800 m (875 yd). The FN M16A4, using safe/semi/three-round burst selective fire, became standard issue for the U.S. Marine Corps.

Military issue rifles were also equipped with a full length quad Knight's Armament Company M5 RAS Picatinny railed hand guard (that holds zero on the top rail), allowing vertical grips, lasers, tactical lights, and other accessories to be attached, coining the designation M16A4 MWS (or Modular Weapon System) in U.S. Army field manuals.

Colt also produces M16A4 models for international purchases:
 R0901 / RO901/ NSN 1005-01-383-2872 (Safe/Semi/Auto)
 R0905 / RO905 (Safe/Semi/Burst)

A study of significant changes to Marine M16A4 rifles released in February 2015 outlined several new features that could be added from inexpensive and available components.  Those features included: a muzzle compensator in place of the flash suppressor to manage recoil and allow for faster follow-on shots, though at the cost of noise and flash signature and potential overpressure in close quarters; a heavier and/or free-floating barrel to increase accuracy from 4.5 MOA (Minute(s) Of Angle) to potentially 2 MOA; changing the reticle on the Rifle Combat Optic from chevron-shaped to a semi-circlar reticle with a dot at the center used in the M27 IAR's Squad Day Optic so as not to obscure the target at long distance; using a trigger group with a more consistent pull force, even a reconsideration of the burst capability; and the addition of ambidextrous charging handles and bolt catch releases for easier use with left-handed shooters.

In 2014, Marine units were provided with a limited number of adjustable stocks in place of the traditional fixed stock for their M16A4s to issue to smaller Marines who would have trouble comfortably reaching the trigger when wearing body armor. The adjustable stocks were added as a standard authorized accessory, meaning units can use operations and maintenance funds to purchase more if needed.

The Marine Corps had long maintained the full-length M16 as their standard infantry rifle, but in October 2015 the switch to the M4 carbine was approved as the standard-issue weapon, giving Marine infantry a smaller and more compact weapon. Enough M4s were already in the inventory to re-equip all necessary units by September 2016, and M16A4s were moved to support and non-infantry Marines.

Summary of differences

Derivatives

Colt Commando (AKA: XM177 & GAU-5)

In Vietnam, some soldiers were issued a carbine version of the M16 named XM177. The XM177 had a shorter  barrel and a telescoping stock, which made it substantially more compact. It also possessed a combination flash hider/sound moderator to reduce problems with muzzle flash and loud report. The Air Force's GAU-5/A (XM177) and the Army's XM177E1 variants differed over the latter's inclusion of a forward assist, although some GAU-5s do have the forward assist. The final Air Force GAU-5/A and Army XM177E2 had an  barrel with a longer flash/sound suppressor. The lengthening of the barrel was to support the attachment of Colt's own XM148 40 mm grenade launcher. These versions were also known as the Colt Commando model commonly referenced and marketed as the CAR-15. The variants were issued in limited numbers to special forces, helicopter crews, Air Force pilots, Air Force Security Police Military Working Dog (MWD) handlers, officers, radio operators, artillerymen, and troops other than front line riflemen. Some USAF GAU-5A/As were later equipped with even longer  1/12 rifled barrels as the two shorter versions were worn out. The  barrel allowed the use of MILES gear and for bayonets to be used with the sub-machine guns (as the Air Force described them). By 1989, the Air Force started to replace the earlier barrels with 1/7 rifled models for use with the M855-round. The weapons were given the redesignation of GUU-5/P.

These were used by the British Special Air Service during the Falklands War.

M4 carbine

The M4 carbine was developed from various outgrowths of these designs, including a number of -barreled A1 style carbines. The weapon became the M4 in 1991. Officially adopted as a replacement for the M3 "Grease Gun" (and the Beretta M9 and M16A2 for select troops) in 1994, it was used with great success in the Balkans and in more recent conflicts, including the Afghanistan and Iraq theaters. The M4 carbine has a three-round burst firing mode, while the M4A1 carbine has a fully automatic firing mode. Both have a Picatinny rail on the upper receiver, allowing the carry handle/rear sight assembly to be replaced with other sighting devices.

M4 Commando

Colt also returned to the original "Commando" idea, with its Model 733, essentially a modernized XM177E2 with many of the features introduced on the M16A2.

M5 carbine

The M5 carbine system was developed by Colt as an improvement on the M4 carbine. It incorporates a fully ambidextrous lower receiver, free-floating barrel and lengthened upper rail. The M5 carbine has four possible barrel lengths: 10.3, 11.5, 14.5 and 16.1 inches. Other M5 variants and calibres are the: M5 SCW (Sub-compact weapon) (5.56x45mm); M5 300 (.300 AAC Blackout); M5 SMG (9x19mm); CMK (7.62x39mm); M7 Battle Rifle (7.62x51mm) and Designated Marksman and Semi-Automatic Sniper System (both 5.56x45mm).

Diemaco C7 and C8

The Diemaco C7 and C8 are updated variants of the M16 developed and used by the Canadian Forces and are now manufactured by Colt Canada. The C7 is a further development of the experimental M16A1E1. Like earlier M16s, it can be fired in either semi-automatic or automatic mode, instead of the burst function selected for the M16A2. The C7 also features the structural strengthening, improved handguards, and longer stock developed for the M16A2. The most easily noticeable external difference between American M16A2s and Diemaco C7s is the retention of the A1 style rear sights. Not easily apparent is Diemaco's use of hammer-forged barrels. The Canadians originally desired to use a heavy barrel profile instead.

The C7 has been developed to the C7A1, with a Weaver rail on the upper receiver for a C79 3.4×28 optical sight, and to the C7A2, with different furniture and internal improvements. The Diemaco produced Weaver rail on the original C7A1 variants does not meet the M1913 "Picatinny" standard, leading to some problems with mounting commercial sights. This is easily remedied with minor modification to the upper receiver or the sight itself. Since Diemaco's acquisition by Colt to form Colt Canada, all Canadian produced flattop upper receivers are machined to the M1913 standard.

The C8 is the carbine version of the C7. The C7 and C8 are also used by Hærens Jegerkommando, Marinejegerkommandoen and FSK (Norway), Denmark's Armed Forces (all branches), and the Netherlands Armed Forces as its main infantry weapon. Following trials, variants became the weapon of choice of the British SAS.

Mk 4 Mod 0
The Mk 4 Mod 0 was a variant of the M16A1 produced for the U.S. Navy SEALs during the Vietnam War and adopted in April 1970. It differed from the basic M16A1 primarily in being optimized for maritime operations and coming equipped with a sound suppressor. The weapon could reportedly be carried to the depth of 200 feet (60 m) in water without damage. The initial Mk 2 Mod 0 Blast Suppressor was based on the U.S. Army's Human Engineering Lab's (HEL) M4 noise suppressor. The HEL M4 vented gas directly from the action, requiring a modified bolt carrier. A gas deflector was added to the charging handle to prevent gas from contacting the user. Thus, the HEL M4 suppressor was permanently mounted though it allowed normal semi-automatic and automatic operation. If the HEL M4 suppressor were removed, the weapon would have to be manually loaded after each single shot. On the other hand, the Mk 2 Mod 0 blast suppressor was considered an integral part of the Mk 4 Mod 0 rifle, but it would function normally if the suppressor were removed. The Mk 2 Mod 0 blast suppressor also drained water much more quickly and did not require any modification to the bolt carrier or to the charging handle. In the late 1970s, the Mk 2 Mod 0 blast suppressor was replaced by the Mk 2 blast suppressor made by Knight's Armament Company (KAC). The KAC suppressor can be fully submerged and water will drain out in less than eight seconds. It will operate without degradation even if the rifle is fired at the maximum rate of fire. The U.S. Army replaced the HEL M4 with the much simpler Studies in Operational Negation of Insurgency and Counter-Subversion (SIONICS) MAW-A1 noise and flash suppressor.

US Navy Mk 12 Special Purpose Rifle

Developed to increase the effective range of soldiers in the designated marksman role, the U.S. Navy developed the Mark 12 Special Purpose Rifle (SPR). Configurations in service vary, but the core of the Mark 12 SPR is an 18" heavy barrel with muzzle brake and free float tube. This tube relieves pressure on the barrel caused by standard handguards and greatly increases the potential accuracy of the system. Also common are higher magnification optics ranging from the 6× power Trijicon ACOG to the Leupold Mark 4 Tactical rifle scopes. Firing Mark 262 Mod 0 ammunition with a 77gr Open tip Match bullet, the system has an official effective range of 600+ meters. However published reports of confirmed kills beyond 800 m from Iraq and Afghanistan were not uncommon.

M231 Firing Port Weapon (FPW)

The M231 Firing Port Weapon (FPW) is an adapted version of the M16 assault rifle for firing from ports on the M2 Bradley. The infantry's normal M16s are too long for use in a "buttoned up" fighting vehicle, so the FPW was developed to provide a suitable weapon for this role.

Colt Model 655 and 656 "Sniper" variants
With the expanding Vietnam War, Colt developed two rifles of the M16 pattern for evaluation as possible light sniper or designated marksman rifles. The Colt Model 655 M16A1 Special High Profile was essentially a standard A1 rifle with a heavier barrel and a scope bracket that attached to the rifle's carry handle. The Colt Model 656 M16A1 Special Low Profile had a special upper receiver with no carrying handle. Instead, it had a low-profile iron sight adjustable for windage and a Weaver base for mounting a scope, a precursor to the Colt and Picatinny rails. It also had a hooded front iron sight in addition to the heavy barrel. Both rifles came standard with either a Leatherwood/Realist scope 3–9× Adjustable Ranging Telescope. Some of them were fitted with a Sionics noise and flash suppressor. Neither of these rifles were ever standardized.

These weapons can be seen in many ways to be predecessors of the U.S. Army's SDM-R and the USMC's SAM-R weapons.

Others
 The Chinese Norinco CQ is an unlicensed derivative of the M16A1 made specifically for export, with the most obvious external differences being in its handguard and revolver-style pistol grip.
 The ARMADA rifle (a copy of the Norinco CQ) and TRAILBLAZER carbine (a copy of the Norinco CQ Type A) are manufactured by S.A.M. – Shooter's Arms Manufacturing, a.k.a. Shooter's Arms Guns & Ammo Corporation, headquartered in Metro Cebu, Republic of the Philippines.
 The S-5.56 rifle, a clone of the Type CQ, is manufactured by the Defense Industries Organization of Iran. The rifle itself is offered in two variants: the S-5.56 A1 with a 19.9-inch barrel and 1:12 pitch rifling (1 turn in 305 mm), optimized for the use of the M193 Ball cartridge; and the S-5.56 A3 with a 20-inch barrel and a 1:7 pitch rifling (1 turn in 177, 8 mm), optimized for the use of the SS109 cartridge.
 The KH-2002 is an Iranian bullpup conversion of the locally produced S-5.56 rifle. Iran intends to replace the standard issue weapon of its armed forces with this rifle.
 The Terab rifle is a copy of the DIO S-5.56 manufactured by the Military Industry Corporation of Sudan.
 The M16S1 is the M16A1 rifle made under license by ST Kinetics in Singapore. It was the standard issue weapon of the Singapore Armed Forces. It is being replaced by the newer SAR 21 in most branches. It is, in the meantime, the standard issue weapon in the reserve forces.
 The MSSR rifle is a sniper rifle developed by the Philippine Marine Corps Scout Snipers that serves as their primary sniper weapon system. 
 The Special Operations Assault Rifle (SOAR) assault carbine was developed by Ferfrans based on the M16 rifle. It is used by the Special Action Force of the Philippine National Police.
 Taiwan uses piston-driven M16-based weapons as their standard rifle. These include the T65, T86 and T91 assault rifles.
 Ukraine has announced plans in January 2017 for Ukroboronservis and Aeroscraft to produce the M16 WAC47, an accurized M4 variation that uses standard 7.62×39 mm AK-47 magazines.
As of November 2019, no weapon manufactured as described in the above lines, has been produced.
 New Zealand has adopted the Lewis Machine and Tool Company's upgraded version of the M16 system to replace the Steyr AUG.  This CQB16 rifle will be fielded in 2017 and is named MARS-L (Modular Ambidextrous Rifle System-Light).

Production and users

The M16 is the most commonly manufactured 5.56×45 mm rifle in the world. Currently, the M16 is in use by 15 NATO countries and more than 80 countries worldwide. Together, numerous companies in the United States, Canada, and China have produced more than 8,000,000 rifles of all variants. Approximately 90% are still in operation. The M16 replaced both the M14 rifle and M2 carbine as standard infantry rifle of the U.S. armed forces. Although, the M14 continues to see limited service, mostly in sniper, designated marksman, and ceremonial roles.

Users

 : Taliban use M16A2 and M16A4 rifles previously supplied for Afghan National Army. Also in use with the Badri 313 Battalion.

 : Special Forces used the M16A1 in the Falklands War and they currently use the M16A2 (by all Armed Forces).
 : M16A4, used by the special forces and State Border Service (DSX).
 
 

 : M16A1/A4
 
 
 : Used by special forces in the final phase of the Araguaia guerilla war. M16A2s used by Brazilian Marine Corps
  M16A2 is used by the Royal Brunei Armed Forces as their main service rifle.
 : Burundian rebels
  M16A1
 
 : C7 and C8 variants made by Colt Canada are used by the Canadian Forces.
 
  M16A1 used by Chilean Marine Corps.

 
  Democratic Forces for the Liberation of Rwanda
 

 :

 
  M16A2
 

  M16A1/A2/A3/A4
  Ex-U.S. M16A1s

 
 : Used by counter-terrorism and special operations forces
 

  M16A2
  M16A2/A3/A4/M4/A2E M4 is used by the Special Forces of the Hellenic Army, Hellenic Air Force and the Hellenic Navy.
 
  M16A1/M16A2.
 

  M16A1
 
 
 
 

 

 : M16A1 is used by Western Army Infantry Regiment along with Howa Type 89 rifles.
  M16A1/A

  M16A1/A2.
 :
  M16A1/A2/A4.
 
  M16A2
 : Lithuanian Armed Forces
  Malaysian Armed Forces, Royal Johor Military Force, Royal Malaysia Police, Malaysian Maritime Enforcement Agency and RELA Corps.
 
 : M16A2 is used by the Mexican Marines in the Mexican Drug War.
 : Compagnie des Carabiniers du Prince

  M16A1/M16A2/M16A3/M16A4
 : M16S1s made by Chartered Industries of Singapore provided secretly in violation of license agreements with Colt.
  M16A2 and M16A4; captured M16A2 were also used by Maoist rebels of the People's Liberation Army, Nepal during the Nepalese Civil War.
 : C7 and C8 variants are used by the Military of the Netherlands and LSW is used by Netherlands Marine Corps.
: Used by the National Police of Nicaragua and army.

 : M16A1 (probably unlicensed copies) used by KPA special forces. Used during the Gangneung incident in 1996.
 
  M16A1
 : Used by Palestinian Security Forces and various local militant forces.
  M16A1.
  M16A2.
 : Used by Bougainville Revolutionary Army. Captured from Papua New Guinea Defence Force.
  M16A2. M16A1 Used by Navy Special Operation Forces, and by Directorate of Special Operations of the national police
 : Manufactured under license by Elisco Tool and Manufacturing. M16A1s and M653Ps in use. Supplemented in Special Forces by the M4 carbine.
 : A small number of M16A2s are used by the Special Actions Detachment of the Portuguese Navy.
  M16A1.

 : M16A1 and M16A2

: 1,000+ M16A1s in use
 : Local variant of the M16A1 (M16S1) manufactured under license by ST Kinetics.
 
 : Used by Special Forces. Likely received from Moroccan stocks.
: During the Vietnam War, the U.S. provided 27,000 M16 rifles to the Republic of Korea Armed Forces in Vietnam. Also, 600,000 M16A1s (Colt Model 603K) were manufactured under license by Daewoo Precision Industries with deliveries from 1974 to 1985. KATUSA (Korean Augmentation to the U.S. Army) soldiers who serve in the U.S. Army use the M16A2.
 

  A small number of M16A2s are used by the Swedish Armed Forces for familiarization training, as well as a similar number of AKMs, but they are not issued to combat units. The Ak 4 and Ak 5 rifles are used by Swedish Army.
  M16A1, as well as indigenous Type 65/65K1/65K2, Type 86 and Type 91 (with AR-18 style gas piston system).
  M16A1/A2/A4. A variant of XM177 replica called Type 49 carbine (ปลส.49) Used in South Thailand insurgency.
  M16A2/A4.
  M16A1/A2/A4.
 
  M16A4s
 
 : One of first military customers as UK purchased first AR-15s to be used in jungle warfare in Indonesia-Malaysia confrontation. The Colt Canada C8 (L119A1/L119A2) variant is used by Royal Military Police Close Protection Units, the Pathfinder Group, United Kingdom Special Forces and 43 Commando Fleet Protection Group Royal Marines.
 
 
 : Obtained from South Vietnam following Vietnam War Over 946,000 M16s were captured in 1975 alone.

Non-state users
  East Indonesia Mujahideen
  Free Papua Movement
 
Bangsamoro Islamic Freedom Fighters
Maute Group
 Kurdistan Workers' Party
 New People's Army: Captured from AFP and PNP, supplied by sympathizers, or purchased from the black market.
  Viet Cong: Captured from U.S. and ARVN forces.

Former users
  Islamic Republic of Afghanistan: Standard issue rifle of the Afghan National Army. Colt Canada C7 variants also saw limited service.
  M16A1 introduced during the Vietnam War and replaced by the F88 Austeyr in 1989.
  Bangsamoro Republik
  FARC
  Free Aceh Movement
 : M16A2 variant. Used by the Royal Hong Kong Regiment.
 : Received from the US government during the Vietnam War and Laotian Civil War.
  Moro Islamic Liberation Front
 M16; replaced in 1988 by Steyr AUG, which was being replaced with a non-Colt M16 variant in 2016.
 Provisional IRA – received a number of M16s during The Troubles in Northern Ireland.
 : M16A1
 : 6,000 M16 and 938,000 M16A1, 1966–1975

Conflicts

1960s
Vietnam War (1955–1975)
Laotian Civil War (1959–1975)
Indonesia–Malaysia confrontation (1963–1966)
Dominican Civil War (1965)
The Troubles (Late 1960s–1998)
Colombian conflict (1964–present)
Rhodesian Bush War (1964–1979)
Communist insurgency in Thailand (1965–1983)
Cambodian Civil War (1968–1975)
Communist insurgency in Malaysia (1968–1989)
Moro conflict (1969–2019)
Communist rebellion in the Philippines (1969–present)

1970s
Yom Kippur War (1973)
Operation Marajoara (1973-1974)
Lebanese Civil War (1975–1990)
East Timor conflict (1975-1999)
Insurgency in Aceh (1976–2005)
Shaba II (1978)
Cambodian–Vietnamese War (1978–1989)
Salvadoran Civil War (1979–1992)
Sino-Vietnamese War

1980s
Sino-Vietnamese conflicts (1979–1991)
Soviet–Afghan War
Falklands War (1982)
Sri Lankan Civil War (1983–2009)
United States invasion of Grenada (1983)
Armed resistance in Chile (1973–1990)
Bougainville Civil War (1988–1998)
First Liberian Civil War (1989–1997)
United States invasion of Panama (1989-1990)

1990s
Gulf War (1990–1991)
Somali Civil War (1991–present)
Sierra Leone Civil War (1991–2002)
Burundian Civil War (1993–2005)
Cenepa War (1995)
Nepalese Civil War (1996–2006)
First Congo War (1996–1997)
Second Liberian Civil War (1999–2003)

2000s
War in Afghanistan (2001–2021)
War in Darfur (2003–present)
Iraq War (2003–2011)
South Thailand insurgency (2004–present)
Kivu conflict (2004–present)
Insurgency in Paraguay (2005–present)
2006 Lebanon War
Mexican drug war (2006–present)
2007 Lebanon conflict (2007)
Cambodian–Thai border dispute (2008–2011)

2010s
Militias-Comando Vermelho conflict (2010–present)
Syrian civil war (2011–present)
Infighting in the Gulf Cartel (2011–present)
2013 Lahad Datu standoff
Iraqi Civil War (2014–2017)
Operation Madago Raya
Battle of Marawi (2017)

2020s
Republican insurgency in Afghanistan (2021-present)
2021 Beirut clashes (2021)
2022 Russian invasion of Ukraine- M16A4s

See also
 Adaptive Combat Rifle
 List of Colt AR-15 and M16 rifle variants
 List of AR platform cartridges
 Colt 9mm SMG
 Comparison of the AK-47 and M16
 Daewoo K2, Republic of Korea Armed Forces (South Korea) assault rifle
 Heckler & Koch HK416
 List of individual weapons of the U.S. armed forces
 M203 40 mm grenade launcher
 Norinco CQ, M16 clone developed by China
 Robinson Arms XCR
 Rubber duck (military)
 T65 assault rifle, AR-15 variant developed by ROC Army
 Winchester LMR
 Squad Designated Marksman Rifle
 SEAL Recon Rifle
 Marine Scout Sniper Rifle
 List of assault rifles

References

Further reading

 Modern Warfare, Published by Mark Dartford, Marshall Cavendish (London) 1985
 Afonso, Aniceto and Gomes, Carlos de Matos, Guerra Colonial (2000), 
 Bartocci, Christopher R. Black Rifle II The M16 into the 21st Century. Cobourg, Ontario, Canada: Collector Grade Publications Incorporated, 2004. 
 
 
 Hutton, Robert, The .223, Guns & Ammo Annual Edition, 1971.
 McNaugher, Thomas L. "Marksmanship, Mcnamara and the M16 Rifle: Organisations, Analysis and Weapons Acquisition"
 
 Pikula, Sam (Major), The ArmaLite AR-10, 1998
 Rose, Alexander. American Rifle-A Biography. 2008; Bantam Dell Publishing. .
 Urdang, Laurence, Editor in Chief. The Random House Dictionary of the English Language. 1969; Random House/New York.
 U.S. Army; Sadowski, Robert A., Editor. The M16A1 Rifle: Operation and Preventive Maintenance Enhanced, hardcover edition 2013; Skyhorse, New York, NY.

External links

 Colt's Manufacturing: The M16A4 Rifle
 PEO Soldier M16 fact sheet
 Combat Training with the M16 Manual
 
 
 , artwork by Will Eisner.
 
 
 

ArmaLite AR-10 derivatives
5.56×45mm NATO assault rifles
Modular firearms
Cold War firearms of the United States
Rifles of the Cold War
Colt rifles
Assault rifles of the United States
United States Marine Corps equipment
Weapons and ammunition introduced in 1964
AR-15 style rifles
Gas-operated firearms